Boundary Bend is a small town in the state of Victoria, Australia. It is near the junction of the Murray River and Murrumbidgee River. It is located about 50 kilometres east along the Murray Valley Highway from the twin towns of Robinvale in Victoria and Euston in New South Wales, about 90 km north of Swan Hill.

The access to the junction of the two rivers is down a track off the highway. It was at this point that Captain Charles Sturt and his party of explorers first sighted the Murray River in 1830. They had travelled down the Murrumbidgee, and continued downstream along the Murray in their whaleboat.

Boundary Bend Post Office opened on 6 April 1923.

For many years, there were two Paddle Steamer hulls located just underwater on the southern bank of the Murray River. These were the Canally and the Hero. Both hulls were raised and removed for restoration in December 1997. The PS Hero was restored to operation at Echuca. The PS Canally is undergoing restoration based at Morgan.

Boundary Bend is popular for its fishing and relaxed lifestyle.

Many returned soldiers from the First World War were allocated farming blocks to the south of the town.

References

Towns in Victoria (Australia)
Rural City of Swan Hill
Populated places on the Murray River
1923 establishments in Australia